Brue is a village on the Isle of Lewis in the Outer Hebrides, Scotland. 

Brue may also refer to:

People
 Jean-Louis Brue (1780–1832), a French general officer 
 Nordahl Brue, (born 1944), an American lawyer and entrepreneur
 Matthew Brue, singer/songwriter, part of Missio (duo)
 André Brüe (1697–1702), of the second Compagnie du Sénégal

Other uses
 River Brue, Somerset, England
 Brief resolved unexplained event (BRUE), a medical term in pediatrics

See also
Bure (disambiguation)
Broo (disambiguation)
Bru (disambiguation)
Brue-Auriac, a commune in the Provence-Alpes-Côte d'Azur region, France